Liu Junnan (Chinese: 刘峻楠 born 31 August 1991) is a Chinese footballer who currently plays as a midfielder for Chinese club a Shanghai Mitsubishi.

Club career
Liu Junnan started his football career with Shanghai Shenhua F.C. where he would make his league debut for them on July 10, 2011 when he came on as a late substitute for Cao Yunding against Qingdao Jonoon F.C. in a 2-1 defeat. Liu would struggle to establish himself within the team and was publicly criticized by his club manager Dražen Besek for diving during a league game against Nanchang Hengyuan on October 29, 2011 in 0-0 draw. While Liu stayed on for a further season he would eventually leave the club at the beginning of the 2013 Chinese Super League season when he joined another top tier club Shanghai Shenxin F.C. where he made his league debut for them on March 29, 2013 against Jiangsu Sainty in a 2-2 draw where he also scored his first goal for them.

In February 2017, Liu transferred to League One club Shijiazhuang Ever Bright. He would represent their reserve team for two seasons before joining fourth tier football club Shanghai Jiading Huilong. At Shanghai he would gain promotion with them in his first season at the end of the 2019 league campaign.

Career statistics
Statistics accurate as of match played 31 December 2020.

References

External links
LIU JUNNAN at Soccerway.com

1991 births
Living people
Chinese footballers
Footballers from Shanghai
Shanghai Shenhua F.C. players
Shanghai Shenxin F.C. players
Cangzhou Mighty Lions F.C. players
Chinese Super League players
China League One players
Association football midfielders
21st-century Chinese people